The 1994 African Junior Athletics Championships was the first edition of the biennial, continental athletics tournament for African athletes aged 19 years or younger. It was held in Algiers, Algeria, from 6–8 July. A total of forty events were contested, 21 by men and 19 by women.

Medal table

Medal summary

Men

Women

References

Results
African Junior Championships 1994. World Junior Athletics History. Retrieved on 2013-10-13.

African Junior Athletics Championships
African U20 Championships
International athletics competitions hosted by Algeria
1994 in Algerian sport
African Junior Athletics
20th century in Algiers
Sport in Algiers
1994 in youth sport